Bić (Serbian Cyrillic: Бић) is a mountain on the border of Serbia and Bosnia and Herzegovina, above the town of Priboj.

References

Mountains of Serbia
Mountains of Bosnia and Herzegovina
International mountains of Europe
Dinaric Alps